Fire Was Born is the first video album by Swedish post-metal band Cult of Luna.  It features an entire live performance, the three music videos, and an interview with guitarist/vocalist Johannes Persson and keyboardist Anders Teglund, in which they answer fan-submitted questions.

Track list
All songs written and performed by Cult of Luna. Recorded 1 July 2008 at Scala, London.

 "Following Betulas"
 "Owlwood"
 "Ghost Trail"
 "Leave Me Here"
 "Österbotten"
 "Finland"
 "Adrift"
 "Eternal Kingdom"
 "Echoes"
 "Dark City, Dead Man"

Music videos
 "The Watchtower"
 "Leave Me Here"
 "Back to Chapel Town"

Personnel

 Klas Rydberg – vocals
 Johannes Persson – guitars, vocals
 Erik Olòfsson – guitars
 Fredrik Kihlberg –guitar, vocals
 Andreas Johansson – bass guitar
 Anders Teglund – keyboards, samples
 Thomas Hedlund – drums
 Magnus Líndberg – drums, percussion

Cult of Luna video albums
2009 video albums
Music video compilation albums
Live video albums
2009 live albums
2009 compilation albums